Oncerometopus is a genus of plant bugs in the family Miridae. There are about 12 described species in Oncerometopus.

Species
These 12 species belong to the genus Oncerometopus:

References

Further reading

 
 
 
 
 
 
 
 

Miridae genera
Restheniini